600,000 Francs a Month is a 1926 French silent comedy film directed by Nicolas Koline and Robert Péguy and starring Charles Vanel and Madeleine Guitty. It was released in the United Kingdom in 1927 with the alternative title of Mister Mustard's Millions.

In 1933 it was remade as 600,000 Francs a Month.

Cast
 Nicolas Koline as Anatole Galupin 
 Charles Vanel as John Durand 
 Madeleine Guitty as Ernestine Galupin 
 Hélène Darly as Anna Galupin 
  as Le secrétaire

References

Bibliography 
 Parish, James Robert. Film Actors Guide. Scarecrow Press, 1977.

External links 
 

1926 films
Films based on French novels
1926 comedy films
French comedy films
French silent feature films
1920s French-language films
Films directed by Robert Péguy
French black-and-white films
Silent comedy films
1920s French films